This is a list of airports in Portugal (including Azores and Madeira), sorted by location.

List
Notes:
 The location is the municipality (município or concelho) which in a few instances is preceded by the parish (freguesia).
 The airport name is linked to the English airport name, followed by the Portuguese name and a link to a web page.

See also 
 Transport in Portugal
 List of airports by ICAO code: L#LP – Portugal
 Wikipedia:WikiProject Aviation/Airline destination lists: Europe#Portugal
 List of the busiest airports in Portugal

References 

 Aeroportos de Portugal SA 
 Instituto Nacional de Aviação Civil 
 List of Certified Aerodromes and Heliports 
 Map of airports in Portugal
 Portuguese Air Force

External links 
 Lists of airports in Portugal:
 Great Circle Mapper
 FallingRain.com
 Aircraft Charter World 
 The Airport Guide
 World Aero Data
 A-Z World Airports

Portugal
 
Airports
Airports
Portugal